was a railway station on the Sasshō Line in Shintotsukawa, Hokkaidō, Japan, operated by the Hokkaido Railway Company (JR Hokkaido).

Lines
Hokkaido Railway Company
Sasshō Line

Station layout
The station had a side platform serving one track. There is no station building or shelter.

Adjacent stations

History
The station opened on 11 November 1956.

In December 2018, it was announced that the station would be closed on May 7, 2020, along with the rest of the non-electrified section of the Sasshō Line. The actual last service was on April 17, 2020 amid the COVID-19 outbreak.

References

---

Stations of Hokkaido Railway Company
Railway stations in Hokkaido Prefecture
Railway stations in Japan opened in 1956
Railway stations closed in 2020